Nick Daicos (born 3 January 2003) is a professional Australian rules football player who plays for the Collingwood Football Club in the Australian Football League (AFL). Daicos is the son of Peter Daicos, who played for Collingwood in the VFL/AFL, and the younger brother of Josh Daicos, who also plays for Collingwood.

Daicos was drafted with pick 4 in the 2021 AFL draft under the father–son rule. Gold Coast made a bid for him with a later draft pick but Collingwood matched their bid.

State football 
Daicos captained the Oakleigh Chargers in the 2021 NAB League. He impressed across five matches, averaging 35.8 disposals and 2 goals per game. Noted for his consistency and clean skills, Daicos was tipped for a high pick in the 2021 AFL draft. Prior he played community  football for Greythorn and Kew Rovers in the Yarra Junior Football League.

AFL career 
Daicos made his AFL debut for Collingwood in Round 1, 2022, against St Kilda. Following his third game, Daicos was nominated for the weekly AFL Rising Star Award.

Daicos produced one of the best seasons by a first year player, averaging 25.8 disposals per game in which he played a halfback role. Daicos won the rising star, collecting 60 votes and beating Sam DeKoning by 12 votes.

Statistics
Updated to the end of round 1, 2023.

|-
| 2022 ||  || 35
| 25 || 7 || 7 || 361 || 283 || 644 || 102 || 54 || 0.3 || 0.3 || 14.4 || 11.3 || 25.8 || 4.1 || 2.2 || 11
|- 
| 2023 ||  || 35
| 1  || 0 || 0 || 21 || 14 || 35 || 7 || 0 || 0 || 0 || 21 || 14 || 35 || 7 || 0 || 0
|- class=sortbottom
! colspan=3 | Career
! 26 !! 7 !! 7 !! 382 !! 297 !! 679 !! 116 !! 54 !! 0.2 !! 0.2 !! 14.6 !! 11.4 !! 26.1 !! 4.4 !! 2.07 !! 11
|}

Honours and achievements
Individual
 AFL Rising Star Award: 2022
 AFLPA Best First Year Player Award: 2022
 22under22 team: 2022
 AFL Rising Star nominee: 2022 (round 3)

References

External links

2003 births
Living people
Australian people of Macedonian descent
Collingwood Football Club players
Oakleigh Chargers players
Australian rules footballers from Victoria (Australia)
People educated at Carey Baptist Grammar School